Ethel Mabel Raby, later Davies (8 October 1914 – 30 March 2008), was an English athlete who competed in the 1938 British Empire Games. She won silver medals in the long jump and 220-110-220-110 yards relay; in the 100 yards and 80 metre hurdles events she was eliminated in the heats. Later that year she competed in the 1938 European Championships in Athletics and finished fourth in the long jump.

References

1914 births
2008 deaths
English female sprinters
English female long jumpers
Athletes (track and field) at the 1938 British Empire Games
Commonwealth Games silver medallists for England
Commonwealth Games medallists in athletics
Medallists at the 1938 British Empire Games